Gabrielle Hecht (born 1965) is an American historian and Stanton Foundation Professor of Nuclear Security and Professor of History at Stanford University. She is known for her works on  radioactive residues, mine waste, air pollution, and the Anthropocene in Africa.

Books
 Being Nuclear: Africans and the Global Uranium Trade
 Entangled Geographies: Empire and Technopolitics in the Global Cold War
 The Radiance of France: Nuclear Power and National Identity (1998/ 2nd ed 2009)

References

External links

Living people
21st-century American historians
Stanford University faculty
Sociologists of science
University of Pennsylvania alumni
Massachusetts Institute of Technology alumni
1965 births
American women sociologists
American women historians
20th-century American historians
American sociologists
20th-century American women writers
21st-century American women writers